Muhammad is a secular biography of the Islamic prophet written by prominent French Marxist historian of Islam Maxime Rodinson in 1961. It focuses on materialist conditions of emergence of Islam. In Egypt, in 1998, censorship controversies forced the American University in Cairo to stop publishing the book.

See also
 List of biographies of Muhammad

References 

Biographies of Muhammad
Non-Islamic Islam studies literature